Marjorie Celeste Champion ( Belcher; September 2, 1919October 21, 2020) was an American dancer and actress. At fourteen, she was hired as a dance model for Walt Disney Studios animated films. Later, she performed as an actress and dancer in film musicals, and in 1957 had a television show based on song and dance. She also did creative choreography for liturgy, and served as a dialogue and movement coach for the 1978 TV miniseries, The Awakening Land, set in the late 18th century in the Ohio Valley.

Early life
Champion was born in Los Angeles, California, on September 2, 1919. Her father, Ernest, was a Hollywood dance director who taught Shirley Temple, Betty Grable, Ramon Novarro, Cyd Charisse, Fay Wray and Joan Crawford, as well as Champion's future husband Gower Champion; her mother was Gladys Lee Baskette (née Rosenberg). Champion had an older half sister, Lina Basquette, who began acting in 1916 in silent films. Lina was the daughter of her mother's first husband, Frank Baskette, who died by suicide. Champion and Basquette's maternal grandfather, Lazarus Rosenberg, was Jewish.

Marjorie began dancing at an early age as her sister had done. She started as a child under the instruction of her father. She studied exclusively with her father from age five until she left for New York. She credited her good health and long career to her father's teaching principles: careful, strict progression of activity, emphasis on correct alignment, precise placement of body, attention to detail and to the totality of dynamics and phrasing. Her first dance partner was Louis Hightower. In 1930, she made her debut in the Hollywood Bowl at age 11 in the ballet "Carnival in Venice". By age twelve, she became a ballet instructor at her father's studio. Marge played Tina in the Hollywood High School operetta The Red Mill. She also sang in the Hollywood High School Girls' Senior Glee Club and graduated in 1936.

She was hired by The Walt Disney Studio as a dance model for their animated film Snow White and the Seven Dwarfs (1937). Her movements were copied to enhance the realism of the animated Snow White figure. For one scene Belcher served as model while wrapped in a baggy overcoat for two dwarfs at once, when for the "Silly Song" dance, Dopey gets on Sneezy's shoulder to dance with Snow White. Belcher later modeled for characters in other animated films: the Blue Fairy in Pinocchio (1940) and Hyacinth Hippo in the Dance of the Hours segment of Fantasia, a ballet parody that she also helped choreograph. She even recalls doing some modeling for Mr. Stork in Dumbo. When working with Disney on Snow White and the Seven Dwarfs, Champion recalls, "the animators couldn't take a young girl out of themselves, they couldn't take the prince out of themselves".

Career
The first picture Belcher remembered being in was The Castles with Fred Astaire and Ginger Rogers. This gave her a feeling that she would really like to do movies but what she really wanted to do was go to New York and be in New York shows. Sadly, Belcher wasn't tall enough for ballet, which is what she trained all her life for.

Together as a dance team, the Champions performed in MGM musicals of the 1940s and 50s, including their first MGM musical Till the Clouds Roll By (1946),  Show Boat (1951) and Everything I Have Is Yours (1952). Other films with Gower included Mr. Music (1950, with Bing Crosby), Give a Girl a Break (1953), Jupiter's Darling (1955), and Three for the Show (1955). MGM wanted the couple to remake Fred Astaire and Ginger Rogers films, but only one, Lovely to Look At (1952), a remake of Roberta (1935), was completed.  The couple refused to remake any of the others, the rights to which were still owned by RKO.

Gower and Marge Champion appeared as the Mystery Guests on the May 15, 1955, airing of What's My Line.  Mary Healy guessed who they were. They appeared again on the February 8, 1959, airing of the show, with panelist Martin Gabel guessing who they were.

During the summer of 1957, the Champions had their own TV series, The Marge and Gower Champion Show, a situation comedy with song and dance numbers. Marge played a dancer and Gower a choreographer.  Real-life drummer Buddy Rich was featured as a fictional drummer named Cozy.

In the 1970s, Champion, actress Marilee Zdenek, and choreographer John West were part of a team at Bel Aire Presbyterian Church that created a number of creative worship services featuring dance and music. They later offered workshops and related liturgical arts programs throughout the country. She and Zdenek co-authored two books, Catch the New Wind and God Is a Verb, related to this work.

Champion served as a dialogue and movement coach for the TV miniseries, The Awakening Land (1978), adapted from Conrad Richter's trilogy of the same name.  It was set in the late 18th-century Ohio Valley.  She has also worked as a dance instructor and choreographer in New York City.  She made a rare television acting appearance in 1982 on the dramatic TV series Fame, playing a ballet teacher with a racial bias against African-American students.

Stage
Champion appeared in several stage musicals and plays on Broadway as a performer. She made her New York debut in What's Up (1943). She also performed in the Dark of the Moon (1945) as the Fair Witch, and Beggar's Holiday (1946) having multiple roles. She made her last Broadway appearance in 3 for Tonight in 1955. She also worked as a choreographer or Assistant, including Lend an Ear in 1948 as assistant to the Choreographer; Make a Wish in 1951, as assistant to Gower Champion; Hello, Dolly! in 1964 as special assistant; and Stepping Out (1987) as choreographic associate.  She appeared as Emily Whitman in the 2001 Broadway stage revival of Follies.  She stated how "as a dancer, by the time you're 40 you're done. If I ever come back, I want to be an actress – it lasts long. But I was 81 when I was in "Follies".

Personal life
Champion married Art Babbitt, an animator at Disney and creator of Goofy, in 1937. They divorced three years later. She married dancer Gower Champion in 1947, and they had two sons (Blake and Gregg). They divorced in January 1973. Belcher met Gower when she was 12 years old in the ninth grade at Bancroft Junior High, and that was when their romance started. Although performances often took them away from California, Los Angeles remained their home base.

Champion married director Boris Sagal in 1977. He died four years later on May 22, 1981 in a helicopter accident during the production of the miniseries World War III.  She became stepmother to Boris' five children including Katey, Jean, Liz, and Joey.  Her son Blake died at the age of 25 in a car accident in 1987.

Death
Champion turned 100 on September 2, 2019.  She died one year later on October 21, 2020, at her son's home in Los Angeles.  She was 101.

Legacy and honors
Champion choreographed Whose Life Is It Anyway?, The Day of the Locust, and Queen of the Stardust Ballroom, for which she received an Emmy Award.  She was honored with the Disney Legends Award in 2007.  Two years later, she was inducted into the National Museum of Dance's Mr. & Mrs. Cornelius Vanderbilt Whitney Hall of Fame  In 2013, Champion received The Douglas Watt Lifetime Achievement Award at the Fred and Adele Astaire Awards ceremonies.

Champion was interviewed in numerous documentaries, including for the behind-the-scenes documentary directed by Oscar-winner Chris Innis, The Story of the Swimmer, which was featured on the 2014 Grindhouse Releasing/Box Office Spectaculars Blu-ray/DVD restoration of The Swimmer. She was also interviewed at a Hollywood film festival screening of The Swimmer by filmmaker Allison Anders for the same release. Champion and Donald Saddler, who met while performing together in the Follies in 2001, are the subjects of a short film about the two dancers leading meaningful lives at age 90.  She still danced twice a week with choreographer, actor, and an original member of American Ballet Theatre, Donald Saddler, who first performed at Jacob's Pillow in 1941. The still-spry dance partners were making a documentary "Still Dancing," which chronicles their biweekly dance sessions.

Selected filmography
Sources: Rotten Tomatoes, TV Guide, and British Film Institute, unless otherwise stated.

References

External links

 
 
 
 
 
 http://www.valyermodancers.org/DanceCompany.html
 Marge Champion performing Dancing in 1986 at Jacob's Pillow
 Archival footage from Jacob's Pillow PillowTalk: Hippo in a Tutu featuring Marge Champion, 8/28/2010 
 
 Marge Champion remembered on 100th birthday in Mansfield News Journal, accessed September 3, 2019

1919 births
2020 deaths
20th-century American actresses
Actresses from Los Angeles
American centenarians
American choreographers
American female dancers
American film actresses
American stage actresses
American television actresses
Dancers from California
Dance teachers
Primetime Emmy Award winners
Women centenarians
American people of Jewish descent
21st-century American women